Irvingia malayana, also known as wild almond or barking deer’s mango, is a tropical evergreen tree species in the family Irvingiaceae. The specific epithet  is from the Latin meaning "of Malaya".

Description

The bark is greyish to whitish. The flowers are greenish white or yellowish.

Distribution and habitat
Irvingia malayana grows naturally in Indo-China and Malesia. Its main habitat is mixed tropical forests, often associated with dipterocarps, from sea-level to  altitude.

Uses
The wood of this tree is used in construction. In Thailand's Roi Et Province it is one of the preferred woods for charcoal, where its seeds are also valued as food and eaten roasted.

References

External links 
 
“Somehow, we managed to live”

Irvingiaceae
Trees of Indo-China
Trees of Malesia
Taxa named by Daniel Oliver
Taxa named by Alfred William Bennett